Dunedin North (previously known as North Dunedin) is a former New Zealand parliamentary electorate, which returned one Member of Parliament (MP) to the New Zealand House of Representatives. It was established for the 1905 election and has existed since. It was last held by David Clark of the New Zealand Labour Party, who replaced the long-standing representative Pete Hodgson. It was considered a safe Labour seat, with Labour holding the seat for all but one term (1975–1978) since .

Population centres

Due to World War II, the 1941 census was postponed. The next census was brought forward to 1945 so that the significant changes in population since the 1936 census could be taken into consideration in a 1946 electoral redistribution prior to the scheduled 1946 general election. At the same time, the Labour government abolished the country quota. The electoral redistribution changed all 76 electorates. When the draft electoral redistribution was released for consultation in early April 1946, it was proposed for the Dunedin North electorate to be abolished and most of its area was supposed to go to a re-created  electorate. Based on consultation feedback, the Port Chalmers Borough became part of the  electorate. With such a geographic change, the proposed name of Chalmers electorate was no longer viable and the name changed to North Dunedin electorate instead. Apart from the Port Chalmers Borough going to Oamaru, there was little change in geographic area covered when Dunedin North became North Dunedin. In the 1952 electoral redistribution, the Oamaru electorate expanded further inland and its southern boundary moved north, resulting in the area north of Dunedin Harbour all going to North Dunedin. In the 1957 electoral redistribution, North Dunedin became more rural in nature by expanding towards the north (the Oamaru electorate was split between North Dunedin, Otago Central and Waitaki at this point).

The character of the electorate changed significantly and it became urban again. In the 1967 electoral redistribution, the North Dunedin electorate moved south, losing the Port Chalmers Borough once more to the re-established Oamaru electorate but gaining area from Dunedin Central. In the 1972 electoral redistribution, Port Chalmers came back to the Dunedin North electorate. There were only minor boundary changes in the 1977 electoral redistribution, but a significant urban shift to the south occurred through the 1983 electoral redistribution, when the Dunedin Central electorate was subsumed by Dunedin North and Dunedin West. There were further boundary changes through the 1987 electoral redistribution.

The 2013 redistribution saw the electorate expand to include Palmerston, Macraes Flat, Moeraki, Hampden and Herbert-Waianakarua. In its final shape from 2014 to 2020, the Dunedin North electorate covered the northern half of the city of Dunedin. It was bordered by Waitaki in the north, Dunedin South in west, south, and south-east, and the Pacific Ocean in the north-east.

The electorate covered what is the equivalent of the Waikouaiti Coast-Chalmers ward of the Dunedin City Council outside the actual urban area of Dunedin. This included the population centre of Waikouaiti, Karitane, Waitati, Seacliff, Warrington, Port Chalmers, Sawyers Bay, Roseneath, and Aramoana.

In urban Dunedin it covered most of northern, central and western Dunedin. This included the city centre and the suburbs of City Rise, Pine Hill, Dunedin North, North East Valley, Opoho, Ravensbourne, Mornington, Roslyn, Maori Hill, Leith Valley, Kaikorai Valley, Brockville, Halfway Bush, and Wakari.

Socio-economic make-up
A notable influence on voting patterns in the electorate was the location of the University of Otago and Otago Polytechnic in Dunedin North. The electorate has the highest proportion of persons aged 15 to 19 in the country, with 14.1%. It also has the highest proportion of people on a student allowance (8.8%), employed in the education and training industry (11.7%), and employed in the health care and social assistance industry (12.3%).

The Dunedin North electorate has a low rate of enrolment compared to New Zealand as a whole. As of 31 May 2012, 78.4% of the estimate eligible population was enrolled to vote, compared to 92.8% nationally. The figure was brought down by the low number of people aged 18 to 24 enrolled — less than half (47.5%) of the estimated eligible population was enrolled, compared to 75.2% nationally. Enrolments of those aged 25 and over are comparable to the national averages.

History
The first representative was Alfred Richard Barclay, who had previously represented the City of Dunedin electorate.

The remnants of United Labour formed the New Zealand Labour Party in 1916 and Walker became the new party's first President.

Walls served the electorate until his death on 6 November 1953.

Rodger retired in 1990 and was succeeded by Pete Hodgson. Hodgson served the electorate until his retirement in 2011.

In the 2019/2020 electoral boundary review, the Electoral Commission added the Otago Peninsula area to the Dunedin North electorate. The electorate's area had to grow as it 5.8% below its population quota, where the maximum allowable quota is capped to 5%.

Members of Parliament
Key

List MPs
Members of Parliament elected from party lists in elections where that person also unsuccessfully contested the Dunedin North electorate. Unless otherwise stated, all MPs terms began and ended at general elections.

Election results

2017 election

2014 election

2011 election

Electorate (as at 26 November 2011): 40,356

2008 election

2005 election

2002 election

1999 election

1996 election

1993 election

1990 election

1987 election

1984 election

1981 election

1978 election

1975 election

1972 election

1969 election

1966 election

1963 election

1960 election

1957 election

1954 election

1953 by-election

1951 election

1949 election

1946 election

1945 by-election

1943 election

1935 election

1931 election

1928 election

1922 by-election

1914 election

Table footnotes

Notes

References

External links
Dunedin North electorate profile (Parliamentary Library)

Historical electorates of New Zealand
Politics of Dunedin
1905 establishments in New Zealand
1946 disestablishments in New Zealand
2020 establishments in New Zealand